Vaya Con Dios is the first studio album by Vaya Con Dios. It was released in 1988.

Track listing

Personnel 
Acoustic guitar — Jean-Michel Gielen, Bert Decorte, Nono Garcia
Backing vocals — Dani Klein, Dirk Schoufs, Julia Loko, Verona Davis, Wild One Dee
Bugle, trumpet — Patrick Mortier
Double bass — Dirk Schoufs
Drums — Marcel De Cauwer
Harmonica — Big Brad
Horns — Pat More Section
Percussion — Kays Rostom
Piano, Hammond organ — Frank Wuyts
Saxophone — Frank Vaganée
Trombone — Joost Derijckere

Charts

Certifications and sales

References

External links 
Vaya Con Dios (LP) at Discogs
Vaya Con Dios (Cassette) at Discogs

1988 debut albums
Ariola Records albums
Vaya Con Dios (band) albums